SS Duncan U. Fletcher was a Liberty ship built in the United States during World War II. She was named after Duncan U. Fletcher, the 21st and 25th Mayor of Jacksonville, Florida, and later the longest serving United States Senator in Florida's history.

Construction
Duncan U. Fletcher was laid down on 3 May 1943, under a Maritime Commission (MARCOM) contract, MC hull 1529, by J.A. Jones Construction, Panama City, Florida; she was launched on 10 August 1943.

History
She was allocated to Lykes Brothers Steamship Company, on 27 August 1943. On 23 April 1946, she was laid up in the National Defense Reserve Fleet, in the James River Group, Lee Hall, Virginia. On 3 April 1947, she was sold for $544,506 to Ionian Steamship Co., Ltd., for commercial use and renamed Pericles. She was scrapped in 1966.

References

Bibliography

 
 
 
 

 

Liberty ships
Ships built in Panama City, Florida
1943 ships
James River Reserve Fleet
Liberty ships transferred to Greece